North Yarmouth, officially the Town of North Yarmouth, is a town in Cumberland County, Maine. The population was 4,072 at the 2020 United States Census. It is part of the Portland–South Portland–Biddeford Metropolitan Statistical Area.

Geography

History
The area embracing North Yarmouth, first settled in 1636, was abandoned twice before successful final settlement in 1713.  In 1646, William Royall (–1676) purchased a farm on the river that, since, has borne his name. John Cousins (–1682), a few years previous, occupied a neck of land between branches of a stream and owned an island, both now bearing his name.  These settlements were established in the vicinity, called by the Wabanakis, as "Wescustogo". Yarmouth originally constituted the eastern portion of North Yarmouth; the “North” in the name intended to differentiate it from  Yarmouth, Massachusetts, on Cape Cod (Maine then being a part of Massachusetts).  North Yarmouth was chartered on September 22, 1680, encompassing the area of the present Town of North Yarmouth and the future towns of Harpswell (until 1750), Freeport (until 1789), Pownal (until 1808, from Freeport), Cumberland (until 1821), and Yarmouth (until 1849).

In 1980, to coincide with the tricentennial celebration of the incorporation of the Town of North Yarmouth, a new printing of William Hutchinson Rowe original 1937 book Ancient North Yarmouth and Yarmouth, Maine 1636–1936: A History was made.

Demographics

2000 census
As of the census of 2000, there were 3,210 people, 1,118 households, and 924 families living in the town. The racial makeup of the town was 98.66% White, 0.09% African American, 0.09% Native American, 0.59% Asian, 0.12% from other races, and 0.44% from two or more races. Hispanic or Latino of any race were 0.47% of the population.

There were 1,118 households, out of which 45.1% had children under the age of 18 living with them, 72.2% were married couples living together, 7.7% had a female householder with no husband present, and 17.3% were non-families. 12.3% of all households were made up of individuals, and 3.9% had someone living alone who was 65 years of age or older.  The average household size was 2.87 and the average family size was 3.13.

In the town, the population was spread out, with 30.2% under the age of 18, 3.6% from 18 to 24, 33.5% from 25 to 44, 25.0% from 45 to 64, and 7.6% who were 65 years of age or older.  The median age was 38 years. For every 100 females, there were 95.9 males.  For every 100 females age 18 and over, there were 94.4 males.

The median income for a household in the town was $60,850, and the median income for a family was $65,000. Males had a median income of $42,986 versus $29,179 for females. The per capita income for the town was $25,180.  About 0.6% of families and 2.3% of the population were below the poverty line, including 1.2% of those under age 18 and 3.3% of those age 65 or over.

2010 census
As of the census of 2010, there were 3,565 people, 1,297 households, and 1,036 families living in the town. The racial makeup of the town was 97.4% White, 0.2% African American, 0.1% Native American, 1.0% Asian, 0.3% from other races, and 1.1% from two or more races. Hispanic or Latino of any race were 0.9% of the population.

There were 1,297 households, of which 42.4% had children under the age of 18 living with them, 68.2% were married couples living together, 7.9% had a female householder with no husband present, 3.8% had a male householder with no wife present, and 20.1% were non-families. 14.9% of all households were made up of individuals, and 6.4% had someone living alone who was 65 years of age or older. The average household size was 2.74 and the average family size was 3.05.

The median age in the town was 42.5 years. 26.6% of residents were under the age of 18; 5.5% were between the ages of 18 and 24; 22.7% were from 25 to 44; 34.7% were from 45 to 64; and 10.4% were 65 years of age or older. The gender makeup of the town was 48.4% male and 51.6% female.

Amenities
The privately owned, unattended Eagle Field airstrip is located between Walnut Hill Road and Prince Well Road, just north of Toots Ice Cream. Its FAA identifier is 15ME, and it was activated in 2006. Its (unpaved) runway headings are 7 and 25 and its height above sea level is 150 feet. Its area control center is Boston Center, while its flight service station is Bangor.

Notable people 

 Rufus Anderson, author, missionary
 Sylvanus Blanchard, sea captain
 Edward Brooks, minister
 Dr. Eleazer Burbank, physician and state legislator
 Augustus W. Corliss, writer and historian
 John Cousins, early settler
 Tristram Gilman, minister
 Jonathan Greeley, sea captain
 Elijah Dix Green, merchant
 William Hawes, mill owner and state legislator
 Gad Hitchcock, physician
 Levi Marston, sea captain
 Ammi Ruhamah Mitchell, physician and state legislator
 Jacob Mitchell, deacon
 Cushing Prince, politician
 Cushing Prince Jr., sea captain
 Harlan Prince, sea captain
 Paul Prince, patriot
 Reuben Prince, sea captain
 William Royall, early settler
 Edward Russell, Maine secretary of state, brigadier general
 Zeruiah Standish, grand-daughter of Myles Standish
 Lyman Fessenden Walker, shipbuilder

See also 

 Old Times in North Yarmouth, Maine

References

External links
 
 North Yarmouth news
 Maine Genealogy: North Yarmouth, Cumberland County, Maine

 
Portland metropolitan area, Maine
Towns in Cumberland County, Maine
1636 establishments in the Thirteen Colonies